Alfonso Mata Suárez (born Valladolid, 14 March 1976) is a Spanish rugby union player. He plays as a flanker and number 8.

Career
His first international cap was during a match against Portugal, at Murrayfield, on December 2, 1998. He was also part of the 1999 Rugby World Cup roster, where he played all the three matches. His last international cap was during a match against Romania, at Madrid, on February 23, 2008.

External links

1976 births
Living people
Sportspeople from Valladolid
Spanish rugby union players
Rugby union flankers
Spain international rugby union players